Cannon A waves, or cannon atrial waves, are waves seen occasionally in the jugular vein of humans with certain cardiac arrhythmias. When the atria and ventricles happen to contract simultaneously, the right atrium contracts against a closed tricuspid valve, resulting in back pressure into the venous system that can be seen in the jugular venous pulse as a high-amplitude "cannon wave". It is associated with heart block, in particular third-degree (complete) heart block. It is also seen in pulmonary hypertension. Cannon A waves may also be seen in ventricular tachycardia due to the inherent AV dissociation of the arrhythmia.

This wave will cause pulsation in the neck and abdomen, headache, cough, and jaw pain.

References

Medical signs
Cardiology